Randy Rasmussen (September 27, 1960) is a former professional American football player who played offensive lineman for five seasons for the Pittsburgh Steelers and Minnesota Vikings

References

1960 births
Living people
American football offensive linemen
Pittsburgh Steelers players
Minnesota Vikings players
Minnesota Golden Gophers football players
People from New Brighton, Minnesota
Players of American football from Minneapolis